An Thuy is a rural commune and village in Lệ Thủy District, Quảng Bình Province, Vietnam. Local economy is mainly agricultural, rice production and cattle breeding.

Communes of Quảng Bình province
Populated places in Quảng Bình province